Acer saccharum, the sugar maple, is a species of flowering plant in the soapberry and lychee family Sapindaceae. It is native to the hardwood forests of eastern Canada and eastern United States. Sugar maple is best known for being the primary source of maple syrup and for its brightly colored fall foliage. It may also be known as "rock maple", "sugar tree", "birds-eye maple", "sweet maple", "curly maple", or "hard maple", particularly when referring to the wood.

Description 

As with most trees, forest-grown sugar maples form a much taller trunk and narrower canopy than open-growth ones.

The basal lobes are relatively small, while the upper lobes are larger and deeply notched. In contrast with the angular notching of the silver maple, however, the notches tend to be rounded at their interior. The fall color is often spectacular, ranging from bright yellow on some trees through orange to fluorescent red-orange on others. Sugar maples also have a tendency to color unevenly in fall. In some trees, all colors above can be seen at the same time. They also share a tendency with red maples for certain parts of a mature tree to change color weeks ahead of or behind the remainder of the tree. The leaf buds are pointy and brown-colored. The recent year's growth twigs are green, and turn dark brown.

The flowers are in panicles of five to ten together, yellow-green and without petals; flowering occurs in early spring after 30–55 growing degree days. The sugar maple will generally begin flowering when it is between 10 and 200 years old. The fruit is a pair of samaras (winged seeds). The seeds fall from the tree in autumn, where they must be exposed to 45 days of temperatures below  to break their coating down. Germination of A. saccharum is slow, not taking place until the following spring when the soil has warmed and all frost danger is past.
It is closely related to the black maple, which is sometimes included in this species, but sometimes separated as Acer nigrum. The western American bigtooth maple (Acer grandidentatum) is also treated as a variety or subspecies of sugar maple by some botanists.

The sugar maple can be confused with the Norway maple, which is not native to America but is commonly planted in cities and suburbs, and they are not closely related within the genus. The sugar maple is most easily identified by clear sap in the leaf petiole (the Norway maple has white sap), brown, sharp-tipped buds (the Norway maple has blunt, green or reddish-purple buds), and shaggy bark on older trees (the Norway maple bark has small grooves). Also, the leaf lobes of the sugar maple have a more triangular shape, in contrast to the squarish lobes of the Norway maple.

Although many people think a red sugar maple leaf is featured on the flag of Canada, the official maple leaf does not belong to any particular maple species; although it perhaps most closely resembles a sugar maple leaf of all the maple species in Canada, the leaf on the flag was specially designed to be as identifiable as possible on a flag waving in the wind without regard to whether it resembled a particular species' foliage.

Ecology 

The sugar maple is an extremely important species to the ecology of many forests in the northern United States and Canada. Pure stands are common, and it is a major component of the northern and Midwestern U.S. hardwood forests. Due to its need for cold winters, sugar maple is mostly found north of the 42nd parallel in USDA growing zones 3–5. It is less common in the southern part of its range (USDA Zone 6) where summers are hot and humid; there sugar maple is confined to ravines and moist flatlands. In the east, from Maryland southward, it is limited to the Appalachians. In the west, Tennessee represents the southern limit of its range and Missouri its southwestern limit. Collection of sap for sugar is also not possible in the southern part of sugar maple's range as winter temperatures do not become cold enough.

The minimum seed-bearing age of sugar maple is about 30 years. The tree is long-lived, typically 200 years and occasionally as much as 300.

Sugar maple is native to areas with cooler climates and requires a hard freeze each winter for proper dormancy. Seed germination also requires extremely low temperatures, the optimal being just slightly above freezing, and no other known tree species has this property. Germination of sugar maple seed in temperatures above  is rare to nonexistent.

Acer saccharum is among the most shade tolerant of large deciduous trees. Its shade tolerance is exceeded only by the striped maple, a smaller tree. Like other maples, its shade tolerance is manifested in its ability to germinate and persist under a closed canopy as an understory plant, and respond with rapid growth to the increased light formed by a gap in the canopy. Sugar maple can tolerate virtually any soil type short of pure sand, but does not tolerate xeric or swampy conditions.

Sugar maples are deeper-rooted than most maples and engage in hydraulic lift, drawing water from lower soil layers and exuding that water into upper, drier soil layers. This not only benefits the tree itself, but also many other plants growing around it.

Human influences have contributed to the decline of the sugar maple in many regions. Its role as a species of mature forests has led it to be replaced by more opportunistic species in areas where forests are cut over. The sugar maple also exhibits a greater susceptibility to pollution than other species of maple. Acid rain and soil acidification are some of the primary contributing factors to maple decline. Also, the increased use of salt over the last several decades on streets and roads for deicing purposes has decimated the sugar maple's role as a street tree. The mushroom Pholiota squarrosoides is known to decay the logs of the tree.

In some parts of New England, particularly near urbanized areas, the sugar maple is being displaced by the Norway maple. The Norway maple is also highly shade tolerant, but is considerably more tolerant of urban conditions, resulting in the sugar maple's replacement in those areas. In addition, Norway maple produces much larger crops of seeds, allowing it to out-compete native species.

Cultivation and uses

Maple syrup and other food use 

The sugar maple is one of the most important Canadian trees, being, with the black maple, the major source of sap for making maple syrup. Other maple species can be used as a sap source for maple syrup, but some have lower sugar content and/or produce more cloudy syrup than these two. In maple syrup production from Acer saccharum, the sap is extracted from the trees using a tap placed into a hole drilled through the phloem, just inside the bark. The collected sap is then boiled. As the sap boils, the water evaporates and the syrup is left behind. Forty gallons of maple sap produces 1 gallon of syrup. In the southern part of their range, sugar maples produce little sap; syrup production is dependent on the tree growing in cooler climates.

The seeds can be soaked, and—with their wings removed—boiled, seasoned, and roasted to make them edible. The young leaves and inner bark can be eaten raw or cooked.

Timber 

The sapwood can be white, and smaller logs may have a higher proportion of this desirable wood. Bowling alleys and bowling pins are both commonly manufactured from sugar maple. Trees with wavy woodgrain, which can occur in curly, quilted, and "birdseye maple" forms, are especially valued. Maple is also the wood used for basketball courts, including the floors used by the NBA, and it is a popular wood for baseball bats, along with white ash. In recent years, because white ash has become threatened by emerald ash borer, sugar maple wood has increasingly displaced it for baseball bat production. It is also widely used in the manufacture of musical instruments, such as the members of the violin family (sides and back), guitars (neck), grand pianos (rim), and drum shells. It is also often used in the manufacture of sporting goods.

Canadian maple, often referred to as "Canadian hardrock maple", is prized for pool cues, especially the shafts. Some production-line cues will use lower-quality maple wood with cosmetic issues, such as "sugar marks", which are most often light brown discolorations caused by sap in the wood. The best shaft wood has a very consistent grain, with no marks or discoloration. Sugar marks usually do not affect how the cue plays, but are not as high quality as those without it. The wood is also used in skateboards, gunstocks, and flooring for its strength. Canadian hardrock maple is also used in the manufacture of electric guitar necks due to its high torsional stability and the bright, crisp resonant tone it produces. If the grain is curly, with flame or quilt patterns, it is usually reserved for more expensive instruments. In high-end guitars this wood is sometimes Torrefied to cook out the Lignin resins, allowing the greater stability to climate & environmental changes, and to enhance its tonal characteristics as the instrument's resonance is more evenly distributed across the cellulose structure of the wood without the lignin.

Urban planting 
Sugar maple was a favorite street and park tree during the 19th century because it was easy to propagate and transplant, is fairly fast-growing, and has beautiful fall color. As noted above, however, it proved too delicate to continue in that role after the rise of automobile-induced pollution and was replaced by Norway maple and other hardier species. It is intolerant of road salt. 
The shade and the shallow, fibrous roots may interfere with grass growing under the trees. Deep, well-drained loam is the best rooting medium, although sugar maples can grow well on sandy soil which has a good buildup of humus. Light (or loose) clay soils are also well known to support sugar maple growth. Poorly drained areas are unsuitable, and the species is especially short-lived on flood-prone clay flats. Its salt tolerance is low and it is very sensitive to boron. The species is also subject to defoliation when there are dense populations of larvae of Lepidoptera species like the rosy maple moth (Dryocampa rubicunda).

Cultivars 
'Apollo' – columnar
'Arrowhead' – pyramidal crown
'Astis' ('Steeple') – heat-tolerant, good in southeastern USA, oval crown
'Bonfire' – fast growing
'Caddo' – naturally occurring southern ecotype or subspecies, from Southwestern Oklahoma, great drought and heat tolerance, good choice for the Great Plains region
'Columnare' ('Newton Sentry') – very narrow
'Fall Fiesta' – tough-leaved, colorful in season, above-average hardiness
'Goldspire' – columnar with yellow-orange fall color
'Green Mountain' (PNI 0285) – durable foliage resists heat and drought, oval crown, above-average hardiness
'Inferno' – possibly the hardiest cultivar, with more red fall color than 'Lord Selkirk' or 'Unity'
'Legacy' – tough, vigorous and popular
'Lord Selkirk' – very hardy, more upright than other northern cultivars
'Monumentale' – columnar
'September Flare' - very hardy, early orange-red fall color
'Sweet Shadow' – lacy foliage
'Temple's Upright' – almost as narrow as 'Columnare'
'Unity' – very hardy, from Manitoba, slow steady growth

Use by Native Americans 
The Mohegan use the inner bark as a cough remedy, and the sap as a sweetening agent, and to make maple syrup following the introduction of metal cookware by Europeans.

Big trees 

The national champion for Acer saccharum is located in Charlemont, Massachusetts. Using the scoring system of circumference in inches plus height in feet plus 25% of crown spread in feet resulted in a total number of 368 points at the National Register of Big Trees.

In popular culture 

The sugar maple is the state tree of the US states of New York, Vermont, West Virginia, and Wisconsin.

It is depicted on the state quarter of Vermont, issued in 2001.

References 

 
 
 Brisson, J., Bergeron, Y., Bouchard, A., & Leduc, A. (1994). Beech-maple dynamics in an old-growth forest in southern Quebec, Canada. Ecoscience (Sainte-Foy) 1 (1): 40–46.

Further reading

External links 

Common Trees of Pennsylvania
UI Plants: Woody Ornamentals (sugar maple)
Acer saccharum at Ohio State Horticulture & Crop Sciences
Acer saccharum images at bioimages.vanderbilt.edu
Winter ID Pictures
Historic Photos and Technical Reports Documenting Sugar Maple Research, from digital archives at the University of Vermont.
Interactive Distribution Map for Acer saccharum

saccharum
Hardwood forest plants
Trees of Canada
Trees of the North-Central United States
Trees of the Northeastern United States
Trees of the Southeastern United States
Flora of the Appalachian Mountains
Crops originating from North America
Plants used in Native American cuisine
Plants used in traditional Native American medicine
Trees of humid continental climate
Plants described in 1785
Taxa named by André Michaux
National symbols of Canada
Symbols of Vermont
Symbols of West Virginia
Symbols of Wisconsin
Garden plants of North America
Ornamental trees
Trees of North America
Trees of the United States
Trees of Eastern Canada
Symbols of New York (state)